The GT Cup Championship is a sports car racing series based in the United Kingdom. It was founded by Marc Haynes in 2007. The championship supported the short-lived British LMP3 Cup in 2017, following the series to Spa-Francorchamps where it participated alongside the field of prototypes. It will support the 2021 GT World Challenge Europe Sprint Cup at Brands Hatch on 1–2 May. GT Cup Championship events consist of 1 free practice session, 1 qualifying session and 2 races per day; the first being a 25-minute sprint and the second being a 50-minute endurance race with driver changes.

Classes

As of the 2021 season, GT Cup has six different classes:

GTO: GT2, GTE, modified cars; silhouettes, replicas.
GT3: Homologated cars running to Group GT3 specifications.
GTA: Lower specification, cup challenge and one-make series cars.
GTB: Early year challenge and cup cars.
GTC: Later year challenge and cup cars.
GTH: Homologated cars running to Group GT4 specifications.

Champions

References

External links

GT Cup Championship
Group GT3
GT4 (sports car class)
2007 establishments in the United Kingdom
National championships in the United Kingdom